Carmine Robert "Roby" La Mura (born 11 October 1968) is an Italian rower. He competed at the 1992 Summer Olympics and the 1996 Summer Olympics.

References

External links
 

1968 births
Living people
Italian male rowers
Olympic rowers of Italy
Rowers at the 1992 Summer Olympics
Rowers at the 1996 Summer Olympics
People from Pompei
Sportspeople from the Province of Naples